Alan Neville Gent (11 November 1927 – 20 September 2012) was a distinguished professor of the University of Akron widely recognized during his lifetime as a world-leading authority on the topic of adhesion physics, crystalline and glassy polymers, and the fracturing of rubber.

Contributions to rubber science
Gent discovered the Fletcher-Gent effect and created the Gent hyperelastic model. He was involved in the investigation of the O-ring failure in the space shuttle Challenger disaster. Gent also published more than 200 works about rubber science, many of which were important contributions on the subject. He was both the editor and author in the textbook Engineering with Rubber, and studied the conditions that cause cavitation in rubber under the action of hydrostatic tensile loading.

Life
Gent was born in Leicester, England.  He obtained degrees in Physics and Maths at the University of London. He obtained a doctorate in 1955 in the mechanics of deformation and fracture of rubber and plastics.

At age 17, Gent worked as a research assistant at the John Bull Rubber Co. He served in the British Army from 1947 to 1949, before becoming a research physicist and later a principal physicist at the British Rubber Producer's Research Association.

Gent joined the faculty of the University of Akron in 1961, spending nearly a half-century at the school.

He had been assistant director of the Institute of Polymer Science, dean of graduate studies and research, as well as a researcher and professor.

Gent obtained the 1975 Bingham Medal and the Colwyn Medal of the Plastics and Rubber Institute in 1978, awarded by the Institute of Materials, Minerals and Mining (IOM3) and the George S. Whitby teaching award in 1987. Gent also received the Charles Goodyear Medal from the ACS Rubber Division in 1990.

He died on 20 September 2012, at the age of 85.

External links
Photograph of Prof. Gent 
 1979 Interview with Alan Gent
 Prof. Gent starred in this University of Akron production of The Adventures of Mr. Tompkins

References

1927 births
2012 deaths
People from Leicester
University of Akron faculty
British Army soldiers
Polymer scientists and engineers
Members of the United States National Academy of Engineering